Dorjee Tshering Lepcha is a Bharatiya Janata Party politician from Sikkim. He has been elected in Sikkim Legislative Assembly election in 2014 and 2019 from Gnathang Machong constituency as candidate of Sikkim Democratic Front but later he joined Bharatiya Janata Party. He was minister of Sikkim Public Works (Buildings & Housing) and Transport in Pawan Chamling fifth ministry from 2014 to 2019.

References 

Living people
Bharatiya Janata Party politicians from Sikkim
Sikkim MLAs 2019–2024
Sikkim Democratic Front politicians
Year of birth missing (living people)
People from Gangtok district